The following is the list of the States of Mexico by life expectancy Mexico has seen declines in some states due to increasing crime in many Mexican cities, especially Ciudad Juarez.

The Data in the 2017 and 2010 columns come from the IHME GBD Results tool. Life Expectancy In Mexico saw large increases before 1990 but recent events involving increased drug activity and increased crime within the cities of Mexico. For example, Campeche had a Life Expectancy in 2010 of 76.30 years and it has declined to 75.07 years. This was primarily due to increased cartel activity within the state.

IHME Rankings 
Mexican States by life expectancy (2017)

Past Life Expectancy

See also
 List of North American countries by life expectancy

References 

Life expectancy
Mexico, life expectancy
Mexico
Life expectancy